The men's 5000 metres team race was the final track and field event on the athletics programme at the 1900 Summer Olympics in Paris. It was the first time that a team race was held at the Olympics. It was held on July 22, 1900. Two teams competed: Racing Club de France from France and Amateur Athletic Association of England from multiple nations (Stan Rowley of Australia completed an otherwise British team). Each team had five athletes. The AAA team won the competition, despite Rowley being injured and unable to finish.

Background

This was the first Olympic team race, but the only time the event was held at a distance of 5000 metres. The distance would vary at 4 miles in 1904 and 3 miles in 1908, before consistency was reached beginning in 1912, with the 3000 metres distance used that year as well as in 1920 and 1924. 

After 1924, the team race was then removed from the program, and has not featured again since.

Competition format

The event consisted of a single heat in which each of the ten runners completed ten laps of the 500 metre track. Runners scored points for their team equal to their place in the race, with the team with the lowest number of points winning.

Records

None, this was the first and only time the event was held.

Schedule

Results

Rimmer and Bennett led the entire way, followed by the first three Frenchmen not far behind. Tysoe and Robinson kept pace with Castanet and Champoudry in the third bunch of runners, while Rowley had been injured and began walking after completing the first lap. 

Bennett pulled away from Rimmer in the final sprint, followed by three Frenchmen. Champoudry crossed the finish line in ninth,  leaving the injured Rowley as the only athlete still running, though he was clearly in pain and had been lapped thrice. 

While the rules of the event stated all team five members had to finish for the team to score, race officials agreed it would be pointless for Rowley to walk the final 1500 metres, and allowed him to retire at the end of his seventh lap.

Individual standings

Team standings

References
 International Olympic Committee.
 De Wael, Herman. Herman's Full Olympians: "Athletics 1900". Accessed 18 March 2006.
 

Men's team 5000 metres
1900